The Book of Odes may refer to one of the following:

The Chinese Classic of Poetry or Shi Jing
The Christian Book of Odes (Bible)
The Arabic Kitab al-Aghani